Darker may refer to:

 Darker (album), a 1997 album by C-Tec
 Darker, a novel by Simon Clark
 Darker (video game), a 1995 computer game by Psygnosis
 Darker (magazine), a Russian horror webzine
 Grant Dooks Darker (1898-1979), mycologists and taxonomist

See also
 Dharker, Indian-Pakistani family-/surname
 Dark (disambiguation)